Aptha is a 2011 Kannada film in the thriller genre starring Pooja Gandhi, Neeraj Sham in the lead roles. The film has been directed and written by Sanjeev Kumar and produced by Dharmalingam and Megoti Sanjeev Kumar . The film is released on 25 February 2011. The core storyline was inspired by the 2006 Malayalam movie Chinthamani Kolacase.

Cast

 Pooja Gandhi
 Neeraj Sham
 Sadhu Kokila
 Pragna
 Poonam
 Bhavyakala
 Manasi Vasudevan
 Bullet Prakash
Gaurav Saudagar 
Ajinkya Saudagar

Reception

Critical response 

A critic from The Times of India scored the film at 3 out of 5 stars and says "While Pooja Gandhi, who comes only in the second half, impresses with matured acting, Neeraj has a long way to go as a hero. Balaji makes for an impressive villain. Music by Escar Mario and cinematography by P S Baba fail to make an impression".

References

2011 films
2010s Kannada-language films
Indian thriller films
2011 thriller films